The Concealed (subtitled Esoteric Secrets and Hidden Traditions of the East) is an album composed by John Zorn. The album was released on Zorn's own label Tzadik Records in November 2012. World premiere of this piece was on 18 May 2012 in Victoriaville. It was recorded on 21 May 2012 in East Side Sound Studio in New York City.

Reception

Allmusic said "These are formal compositions, played with a light and spacious touch; compelling textures and rhythmic variety add dimension while limited but stunning improvisational acumen is also on display. For its dreamy accessibility and sheer lyricism, The Concealed feels like a recital of sacred songs, rooted in history and layered in mystery, interpreted through Zorn's dual role as composer and medium".
Martin Schray stated "The album is especially great because of its variety, its accessibility, its rhythmic and harmonic complexity and its awe-inspiring musicianship".

Track listing
All compositions by John Zorn

Personnel
Mark Feldman − violin
Erik Friedlander − cello
John Medeski − piano
Kenny Wollesen − vibraphone
Trevor Dunn − bass
Joey Baron − drums

References

2012 albums
John Zorn albums
Albums produced by John Zorn
Tzadik Records albums
Instrumental albums